Peter Burke (born 22 October 1982) is an Irish Fine Gael politician who has served as Minister of State for European Affairs and Minister of State at the Department of Defence since December 2022. He previously served as Minister of State at the Department of Housing, Local Government and Heritage from 2020 to 2022. He has been a Teachta Dála (TD) for the Longford–Westmeath constituency since 2016.

He was a member of Westmeath County Council from 2009 to 2016. He lives in Mullingar with his wife and two children.

Peter Burke was a frequent media commentator during the 32nd Dáil on issues including finance and taxation, drawing from his private sector experience as a Chartered Accountant. 

On 1 July 2020, following the formation of the Government of the 33rd Dáil, Burke was appointed as a Minister of State at the Department of Housing, Local Government and Heritage with responsibility for Local Government and Planning.

He is a close ally of Leo Varadkar, and was a prominent supporter of his in his campaign to be the leader of Fine Gael in 2017, stating at the time that there were "two strong candidates in the race, and I know that neither will let the competition become divisive for the party or the country".

In December 2022, he was appointed as Minister of State for European Affairs and Minister of State at the Department of Defence following the appointment of Leo Varadkar as Taoiseach.

References

External links
Peter Burke's page on the Fine Gael website

Living people
Members of the 32nd Dáil
Members of the 33rd Dáil
Fine Gael TDs
Local councillors in County Westmeath
People from Mullingar
1982 births
Ministers of State of the 33rd Dáil